Anadolu Medical Center is a hospital in Gebze, Kocaeli, Turkey. It is located in Çayırova on the highway  at the Bayramoğlu exit, close to Sabiha Gökçen International Airport. It consists of 209 beds, 59 intensive care beds and 8 operating rooms. The parking lot is capable of 350 cars. The medical center was initially as a specialized cancer center but then it transformed into a multidisciplinary hospital. Anadolu is one of the most popular centers of bone transplantation BMT in the Mediterranean with up to 22 stem cell transplants can be performed simultaneously.

It has ISO 9001–2000 (Quality Management System), ISO 14001 (Environment Management System), OHSAS 18001 (Work Health and Safety) and JCI (Joint Commission International) certifications. The hospital is affiliated with the Johns Hopkins Hospital in the United States through Johns Hopkins Medicine International.

IMRT and Cyberknife are two of the latest technologies used in cancer treatment developed at the Anadolu Medical Center. The hospital also provides multidisciplinary care, free check ups, patient education, first aid courses, and courses related to preventive medicine. Its cancer centre is an OECI-designated clinical cancer centre.

Anadolu Medical Center has outpatient clinics in Istanbul at Ataşehir .

References

Hospital buildings completed in 2005
Hospitals in Turkey
Hospitals established in 2005
Affiliates of Johns Hopkins Hospital
Buildings and structures in Kocaeli Province
2005 establishments in Turkey
Gebze
21st-century architecture in Turkey